There are several rivers named Três Barras River in Brazil:

 Três Barras River (Paraná)
 Três Barras River (Santa Catarina)